Lucerne is a ghost town in Center Township, Columbiana County, Ohio, United States.

History
A post office was established at Lucerne in 1893, and remained in operation until it was discontinued in 1901 The community was named after Lake Lucerne, in Switzerland.

References

Geography of Columbiana County, Ohio
Ghost towns in Ohio
1893 establishments in Ohio
Populated places established in 1893